In Eastern Orthodox Christian theology, the Tabor Light ( "Light of Tabor", or  "Uncreated Light",  "Divine Light";  "Taboric Light"; Georgian: თაბორის ნათება) is the light revealed on Mount Tabor at the Transfiguration of Jesus, identified with the light seen by Paul at his conversion.

As a theological doctrine, the uncreated nature of the Light of Tabor was formulated in the 14th century by Gregory Palamas, an Athonite monk, defending the mystical practices of Hesychasm against accusations of heresy by Barlaam of Calabria. When considered as a theological doctrine, this view is known as Palamism after Palamas.

The view was very controversial when it was first proposed, sparking the Hesychast controversy, and the Palamist faction prevailed only after the military victory of John VI Kantakouzenos in the Byzantine civil war of 1341–1347. Since 1347, it has been the official doctrine in Eastern Orthodoxy, while it remains without explicit affirmation or denial by the Roman Catholic Church. 
Roman Catholic theologians have rejected it in the past, but the Catholic view has tended be more favourable since the later 20th century.<ref>"the Western world has started to rediscover what amounts to a lost tradition. Hesychasm, which was never anything close to a scholar's pursuit, is now studied by Western theologians who are astounded by the profound thought and spirituality of late Byzantium." [https://books.google.com/books?id=1UZCTtEuGcMC&q=hesychasm+catholicAndreasAndreopoulos%2C%27%27Metamorphosis%3A&pg=PA215 The Transfiguration in Byzantine Theology and Iconography (St Vladimir's Seminary Press 2005]), pp. 215-216.</ref> Several Western scholars have presented Palamism as compatible with Catholic doctrine.
In particular, Pope John Paul II in 1996 spoke favourably of hesychast spirituality,Original text (in Italian)
Speaking of the hesychast controversy, Pope John Paul II said the term "hesychasm" refers to a practice of prayer marked by deep tranquillity of the spirit intent on contemplating God unceasingly by invoking the name of Jesus. While from a Catholic viewpoint there have been tensions concerning some developments of the practice, the Pope said, there is no denying the goodness of the intention that inspired its defence, which was to stress that man is offered the concrete possibility of uniting himself in his inner heart with God in that profound union of grace known as Theosis, divinization. and in 2002 he named the Transfiguration as the fourth Luminous Mystery of the Holy Rosary.

In Eastern Orthodoxy
According to the Hesychast mystic tradition of Eastern Orthodox spirituality, a completely purified saint who has attained divine union experiences the vision of divine radiance that is the same 'light' that was manifested to Jesus' disciples on Mount Tabor at the Transfiguration. This experience is referred to as theoria. Barlaam (and Western Christianity's interpretation of apophaticism being the absence of God rather than the unknowability of God) held this view of the hesychasts to be polytheistic inasmuch as it seemed to postulate two eternal substances, a visible (the divine energies) and an invisible (the divine ousia or essence).
Seco and Maspero assert that the Palamite doctrine of the uncreated light is rooted in Palamas' reading of Gregory of Nyssa.

Instances of the Uncreated Light are read into the Old Testament by Orthodox Christians, e.g. the Burning Bush a purported descendant of which is kept at the Saint Catherine's Monastery at Mount Sinai in the Sinai Peninsula.

Hesychast controversy

Gregory Palamas defended Hesychasm in the 1340s at three different synods in Constantinople, and he also wrote a number of works in its defense. In these works,  Gregory Palamas uses a distinction, already found in the 4th century in the works of the Cappadocian Fathers, between the energies or operations (Gr. energeiai) of God and the essence (ousia) of God. Gregory taught that the energies or operations of God were uncreated. He taught that the essence of God can never be known by his creatures even in the next life, but that his uncreated energies or operations can be known both in this life and in the next, and can convey to the Hesychast in this life and to the righteous in the next life as a true spiritual knowledge of God (theoria). In Palamite theology, it is the uncreated energies of God that illumine the Hesychast who has been vouchsafed an experience of the Uncreated Light.

In 1341 the dispute came before a synod held at Constantinople and presided over by the Emperor Andronicus III Palaeologus; the synod, taking into account the regard in which the writings of the pseudo-Dionysius were held, condemned Barlaam, who recanted and returned to Calabria, afterwards becoming bishop in the Roman Catholic Church.

One of Barlaam's friends, Gregory Akindynos, who originally was also a friend of Gregory's, took up the controversy, and three other synods on the subject were held, at the second of which the followers of Barlaam gained a brief victory. However, in 1351 at a synod under the presidency of the Emperor John VI Cantacuzenus, Hesychast doctrine was established as the doctrine of the Eastern Orthodox Church.

Identification with the fires of hell
Many Orthodox theologians have identified the Tabor light with the fire of hell. According to these theologians, hell is the condition of those who remain unreconciled to the uncreated light and love of and for God and are burned by it.PARADISE AND HELL IN THE ORTHODOX TRADITION by Fr. George Mmetallinos, Orthodox Heritage, Vol. 07, Issue 03-04
March–April 2009. According to Iōannēs Polemēs, Theophanes of Nicea believed that, for sinners, "the divine light will be perceived as the punishing fire of hell".

According to Iōannēs Polemēs, Palamas himself did not identify hell-fire with the Tabor light: "Unlike Theophanes, Palamas did not believe that sinners could have an experience of the divine light [...] Nowhere in his works does Palamas seem to adopt Theophanes' view that the light of Tabor is identical with the fire of hell."

Roman Catholicism

Palamism, Gregory Palamas' theology of divine "operations", was never accepted by the Scholastic theologians of the Latin Catholic Church, who maintained a strong view of the simplicity of God, conceived as Actus purus.
This doctrinal division reinforced the east–west split of the Great Schism throughout the 15th to 19th centuries, with only Pope John Paul II opening a possibility for reconciliation by expressing his personal respect for the doctrine.

Catholicism traditionally sees the glory manifested at Tabor as symbolic of the eschatological glory of heaven; in a 15th-century Latin hymn Coelestis formam gloriae (Sarum Breviary, Venice, 1495; trans. Rev. John M. Neale, 1851):
O wondrous type, O vision fair / of glory that the Church shall share / Which Christ upon the mountain shows / where brighter than the sun He glows / With shining face and bright array / Christ deigns to manifest today / What glory shall be theirs above / who joy in God with perfect love.

Pope Gregory the Great wrote of people by whom, "while still living in this corruptible flesh, yet growing in incalculable power by a certain piercingness of contemplation, the Eternal Brightness is able to be seen." In his poem The Book of the Twelve Béguines, John of Ruysbroeck, a 14th-century Flemish mystic beatified by Pope Pius X in 1908, wrote of "the uncreated Light, which is not God, but is the intermediary between Him and the 'seeing thought'" as illuminating the contemplative not in the highest mode of contemplation, but in the second of the four ascending modes.

Roman Catholic pro-ecumenism under John Paul II from the 1980s 
sought for common ground in questions of doctrinal division between the Eastern and the Western Church. 
John Paul II repeatedly emphasized his respect for Eastern theology as an enrichment for the whole church, and spoke favourably of Hesychasm. In 2002, he also named the Transfiguration as the fourth Luminous Mystery of the Holy Rosary. The Eastern doctrine of "uncreated light" has not been officially accepted in the Catholic Church, which likewise has not officially condemned it. Increasing parts of the Western Church consider Gregory Palamas a saint, even if uncanonized. "Several Western scholars contend that the teaching of St. Gregory Palamas himself is compatible with Roman Catholic thought on the matter."
At the same time, anti-ecumenical currents within Eastern Orthodoxy presented the Tabor Light doctrine as a major dogmatic division between the Eastern and the Western Church, with the Hesychast movement even described as "a direct condemnation of Papism".

Popular culture
"Tabor Light" was also used in the popular press of 1938 in reference to a mysterious light seen around a cemetery named "Tabor" near Esterhazy, Saskatchewan, Canada.

See also
 
Eastern Orthodox Christian theology
Palamism
Apophatic theology
Beatific vision
Christian mysticism
Divine light
Enlightenment (spiritual)
Halo (religious iconography)
Glory (religion)
Holy Fire
Mystical theologyNoesisOhr (Kabbalah)
Theophany
Theoria (state wherein one sees the Tabor Light)
Theosis or deification

References

Literature
Lowell Clucas, 'The Triumph of Mysticism in Byzantium in the Fourteenth Century', in: Byzantine Studies in Honor of Milton V. Anastos, Byzantina kai Metabyzantina, ed. Speros Vryonis jr,  Malibu (1985). 
Vladimir Lossky, The Mystical Theology of the Eastern Church, SVS Press, 1997. James Clarke & Co Ltd, 1991.
George S. Maloney, A Theology of Uncreated Energies of God (1978), .
George C. Papademetriou, Introduction to Saint Gregory Palamas (2005), .
J. Meyendorff, A Study of St. Gregory Palamas (1959).
Andreas Andreopoulos, Metamorphosis: The Transfiguration in Byzantine Theology and Iconography'' SVS Press, 2005.

External links
Light in Icon (Russia-hc.ru)
The Sunday of St. Gregory Palamas (The Second Sunday of Great and Holy Lent) by Benedict Seraphim
Theoria, Tabor Light (photismos) as Vision

Hesychasm
Christian terminology
Palamism
Light and religion
Mount Tabor
Hell